Goguryeo Bigi (Chinese Gaojuli biji 高句麗秘記, literally "the secret record of Goguryeo") was apparently a book of prognostication regarding the state of Goguryeo based upon the principles of fengshui (風水, Korean, pungsu). It is no longer extant.

References

Kim Hong-jik 金弘稙, “Goguryeo bigi go 高句麗秘記考” [A study of the ‘secret record of Goguryeo’]. Hanguk godaesa yeongu 韓國高代史硏究 (Seoul: Singu munhwasa, 1971).

Goguryeo
History books about Korea